Antonije is a Serbian given name. Notable people with this name include the following:

Antonije Abramović (1919–1996), Montenegrin Eastern Orthodox priest
Antonije Bagaš (fl. 1366 – 1385), Serbian nobleman
Antonije Isaković (1923–2002), Serbian writer
Antonije Pušić, known as Rambo Amadeus, Montenegrin entertainer
Antonije Ristić-Pljakić, Serbian military leader 
Antonije I Sokolović (died 1574), Serbian Archbishop
Antonije Znorić (fl. 1689–d. 1695), Serbian military officer

See also

Antonie (given name)
Antonija
Antonijo
Antonijs
Ante (given name)

Notes

Serbian masculine given names